Deepak Joshi is an Indian politician. He was elected to the Madhya Pradesh Legislative Assembly from Bagli for one term (2003-2008). He then represented the Hatpipliya Assembly constituency for two terms as its MLA from 2008 to 2018. During his last term, he served as Minister of Technical Education and Skills Development, and of School Education for Madhya Pradesh.

Family
He is the son of Kailash Chandra Joshi, who served as the 9th Chief Minister of Madhya Pradesh in 1970s.

Electoral Record

References

|-

Madhya Pradesh MLAs 2003–2008
Madhya Pradesh MLAs 2008–2013
Madhya Pradesh MLAs 2013–2018
Bharatiya Janata Party politicians from Madhya Pradesh
Living people
People from Dewas
People from Dewas district
1962 births